The 2017 Big South Conference women's soccer tournament was the postseason women's soccer tournament for the Big South Conference held from October 27 through November 5, 2017. The quarterfinals of the tournament were held at campus sites, while the semifinals and final took place at Bryan Park in Greensboro, North Carolina. The eight-team single-elimination tournament consisted of three rounds based on seeding from regular season conference play. The Liberty Flames were the defending champions, but they were eliminated from the 2017 tournament with a 2–0 semifinal loss to the Longwood Lancers. The High Point Panthers won the tournament with a 1–0 win over Longwood in the final. The conference tournament title was the sixth for the High Point women's soccer program and the fourth for head coach Marty Beall.

Bracket

Schedule

Quarterfinals

Semifinals

Final

Statistics

Goalscorers 

2 Goals
 Meredith Dunker - High Point

1 Goal
 Kelly Almedia - Longwood
 Anna Brantley - Campbell
 Bri Jean-Charles - High Point
 Shelby Denkert - Campbell
 Sarah Erickson - Liberty
 Teresa Fruchterman - Longwood
 Devon Jones - Liberty
 Emilie Kupsov - Longwood
 Aley McKinley - High Point
 Michele Micciche - High Point
 Emily Mothersbaugh - Longwood
 Paige Rombach - High Point
 Annie Ross - Gardner–Webb
 Sydney Wallace - Longwood
 Shannon Wratchford - Campbell

See also 
 Big South Conference
 2017 NCAA Division I women's soccer season
 2017 NCAA Division I Women's Soccer Tournament
 2017 Big South Conference Men's Soccer Tournament

References 

2017 Big South Conference women's soccer season
Big South Conference Women's Soccer Tournament